Commando 3 may refer to:
Wolf of the Battlefield: Commando 3, a 2008 video game
Commando 3 (film), a 2019 Indian film